Parapercis katoi is a fish species in the sandperch family, Pinguipedidae. It is found in Japan.

Etymology
The fish is named in honor of Kenji Kato, of the Tokyo Metropolitan Fisheries Experiment Station, who caught the holotype in 1991 with hook and line and provided color photographs of the live fish.

References

Pinguipedidae
Taxa named by John Ernest Randall
Taxa named by Hiroshi Senou
Taxa named by Tetsuo Yoshino
Fish described in 2008